The 2017 Asian Men's Club Volleyball Championship was the 18th staging of the AVC Club Championships. The tournament was held in Ninh Bình and Nam Định, Vietnam from 28 June to 6 July 2017.

Pools composition
Teams were seeded in the first two positions of each pool following the Serpentine system according to their final standing of the 2016 edition. AVC reserved the right to seed the hosts as head of pool A regardless of the final standing of the 2016 edition. All teams not seeded were drawn in Bangkok, Thailand on 27 February 2017. But, United Arab Emirates later withdrew. Final standing of the 2016 edition are shown in brackets except the hosts who ranked 7th.

Venues
 Ninh Bình Gymnasium, Ninh Bình, Vietnam – Preliminary round, Pool E, F,  Quarterfinals and Final four
 Nam Định Gymnasium, Nam Định, Vietnam – Preliminary round, Pool E, G, 5th-8th places and 9th–12th places

Pool standing procedure
 Number of matches won
 Match points
 Sets ratio
 Points ratio
 Result of the last match between the tied teams

Match won 3–0 or 3–1: 3 match points for the winner, 0 match points for the loser
Match won 3–2: 2 match points for the winner, 1 match point for the loser

Preliminary round
All times are Vietnam Standard Time (UTC+07:00).

Pool A

|}

|}

Pool B

|}

|}

Pool C

|}

|}

Pool D

|}

|}

Classification round
All times are Vietnam Standard Time (UTC+07:00).
The results and the points of the matches between the same teams that were already played during the preliminary round shall be taken into account for the classification round.

Pool E

|}

|}

Pool F

|}

|}

Pool G

|}

|}

Pool H

|}

Final round
All times are Vietnam Standard Time (UTC+07:00).

9th–12th places

9th–12th semifinals

|}

11th place match

|}

9th place match

|}

Final eight

Quarterfinals

|}

5th–8th semifinals

|}

Semifinals

|}

7th place match

|}

5th place match

|}

3rd place match

|}

Final

|}

Final standing

Awards

Most Valuable Player
 Shahram Mahmoudi (Sarmayeh Bank Tehran)
Best Setter
 Łukasz Żygadło (Sarmayeh Bank Tehran)
Best Outside Spikers
 Shuzo Yamada (Toyoda Gosei Trefuerza)
 Milad Ebadipour (Sarmayeh Bank Tehran)

Best Middle Blockers
 Mohammad Mousavi (Sarmayeh Bank Tehran)
 Damir Akimov (Altay)
Best Opposite Spiker
 György Grozer (Al Arabi)
Best Libero
 Koichiro Koga (Toyoda Gosei Trefuerza)

References

External links
Official website
Regulations
Squads

Asian Men's Club Volleyball Championship
International volleyball competitions hosted by Vietnam
2017 in Vietnamese sport
June 2017 sports events in Asia
July 2017 sports events in Asia